Wachtel is a surname of German origin, meaning quail. Notable people with this surname include:

 Arthur Wachtel (1904–1997), New York politician and judge
 Christine Wachtel (born 1965), German track and field athlete 
 Eleanor Wachtel (born 1947), Canadian writer and broadcaster
 Emily Wachtel, American actress and writer, niece of Waddy Wachtel
 Harry H. Wachtel (1917–1997), New York attorney
 Marion Wachtel (1873/1877–1954), American painter
 Waddy Wachtel (born 1947), American musician
 Andrew Wachtel (born 1959), American scholar, translator and educator
 Charlie Wachtel (born 1987), Screenwriter, winner of Academy Award for Best Writing (Adapted Screenplay) for 2018 film “BlaKkKlansman” (co-writer with David Rabinowitz)

Other names meaning "wachtel"
Italian: Quaglia
Slovenian: Prepelič

See also
 Wachter
 Wachtler

German-language surnames

de:Wachtel
fr:Wachtel